Cusiala is a genus of moths in the family Geometridae.

Species
 Cusiala boarmoides Moore, [1887]
 Cusiala raptaria Walker
 Cusiala stipitaria (Oberthür, 1880)

References
 Cusiala at Markku Savela's Lepidoptera and Some Other Life Forms
 Natural History Museum Lepidoptera genus database

Boarmiini